Murray Gordon Avery is a former New Zealand freestyle wrestler. He won a bronze medal representing New Zealand in the heavyweight division at the New Zealand at the 1978 Commonwealth Games in Edmonton. Four years later, he wrestled for Australia at the 1982 Commonwealth Games in Brisbane, once again winning the bronze medal in the heavyweight division.

Avery subsequently returned to New Zealand to live in Rotorua. With his wife, Maryann, he had three children, including professional racing cyclist Clinton Avery.

References

Year of birth missing (living people)
Living people
Wrestlers at the 1978 Commonwealth Games
Wrestlers at the 1982 Commonwealth Games
Commonwealth Games bronze medallists for New Zealand
Commonwealth Games bronze medallists for Australia
New Zealand male sport wrestlers
Commonwealth Games medallists in wrestling
20th-century New Zealand people
Medallists at the 1978 Commonwealth Games
Medallists at the 1982 Commonwealth Games